Alexander George Fraser (1786–1865) was a Scottish genre and domestic painter who exhibited his paintings at the Royal Academy in London for many years. His son, Alexander Fraser (1827-1899), was also a prominent artist with whom he is sometimes confused (and his paintings are sometimes misidentified as being by his son).

Life 
Fraser was born in Edinburgh on 7 April 1786. His father was Alexander Fraser, a grocer, and his mother, Madgalane Davie.

He studied painting under John Graham (1754-1817) at the Trustees Drawing Academy of Edinburgh. His fellow pupils included William Allan (1782–1850), John Burnet (1784–1868), and David Wilkie (1785–1841). He began exhibiting at the Royal Academy in 1810 and moved to London in 1813. David Wilkie had preceded him to London and he employed Fraser as an assistant to paint details and still life in his pictures. Of Wilkie's many followers, Fraser was the most capable. Many of his paintings were humorous and on a small scale, for example, The Scotch Fair (c. 1834) or Music Makers. On 30 June 1826, he married Janet William Moir in Edinburgh, and Alexander Fraser was their son. In 1840, Fraser was elected an associate of the Royal Scottish Academy, an institution he had helped to found. In 1842, his Naaman Cured of the Leprosy obtained the premium at the British Institution for best picture of the year. From 1848, ill health prevented him from painting and he ceased exhibiting at the Royal Academy.

He died at Wood Green, Hornsey, London on 15 February 1865 and was buried in a common grave on the eastern side of Highgate Cemetery (plot no. 13621) eight days later.

Notable paintings

Notes

References

External links 
 . Retrieved 2012-03-08.
  Retrieved 2015-12-08

1786 births
1865 deaths
Burials at Highgate Cemetery
Artists from Edinburgh
19th-century Scottish painters
Scottish male painters
Alumni of the Edinburgh College of Art
British genre painters
Royal Scottish Academicians
19th-century Scottish male artists